The Oceans, Fisheries, Climate Change and Manufacturing is a subcommittee within the Senate Committee on Commerce, Science and Transportation. It was formerly the Senate Commerce Subcommittee on Science, Oceans, Fisheries, and Weather during the 116th Congress. Prior to the 116th Congress, it was formerly the Subcommittee on Oceans, Atmosphere, Fisheries, and Coast Guard.

Jurisdiction
The Subcommittee on Oceans, Fisheries, Climate Change and Manufacturing has jurisdiction over coastal zone management; ocean, weather, and atmospheric activities; marine fisheries; and marine mammals. The subcommittee also conducts oversight on the National Oceanic and Atmospheric Administration (NOAA), U.S. Coast Guard, the Marine Mammal Commission (MMC), U.S. Global Change Research Program, and Minority Business Development Agency, as well as the Department of Commerce manufacturing bureaus and workforce development matters.

Members, 118th Congress

Historical subcommittee rosters

117th Congress

116th Congress

References

External links
 Oceans, Fisheries, Climate Change and Manufacturing

Commerce Oceans, Atmosphere, Fisheries and Coast Guard